Ameiva atrigularis, known as giant ameiva and Amazon racerunner, is a species of teiid lizard found on Trinidad and Tobago and in Venezuela.

References

Ameiva
Reptiles described in 1887
Taxa named by Samuel Garman
Lizards of South America
Reptiles of Trinidad and Tobago
Reptiles of Venezuela